Earl Harrison (born August 20, 1961) is a former American professional basketball player. Harrison grew up in Lindenwold, New Jersey. During his pro club career, he played at the power forward and center positions.

College career
Harrison played college basketball at Morehead State University, with the Morehead State Eagles, from 1981 to 1984.

Professional career
Harrison was drafted in the fourth round, with the 91st overall pick, of the 1984 NBA Draft, by the Philadelphia 76ers. He played with the La Crosse Catbirds, in the Continental Basketball Association, in the 1985–86 season. Harrison also played with the Greek club Pagrati Athens, from 1989 to 1992. 

In the 1991–92 season, he averaged 25.5 points and 13.4 rebounds per game in the Greek Basket League. Harrison transferred from Pagrati to the Greek club PAOK Thessaloniki in 1992, but due to a serious injury that he suffered, he was replaced in the team by Cliff Levingston. In the 1993–94 season, Jones played with the Cypriot League club APOEL Nicosia. With APOEL, he won the Cypriot Cup and the Cypriot Supercup.

References

External links
FIBA Europe Profile
ProBallers.com Profile
RealGM.com Profile
Eurobasket.com Profile
TheDraftReview.com Profile

1961 births
Living people
American expatriate basketball people in Cyprus
American expatriate basketball people in Greece
American men's basketball players
APOEL B.C. players
Basketball players from New Jersey
Centers (basketball)
Greek Basket League players
La Crosse Catbirds players
Lancaster Lightning players
Louisville Catbirds players
Morehead State Eagles men's basketball players
Pagrati B.C. players
P.A.O.K. BC players
People from Lindenwold, New Jersey
Philadelphia 76ers draft picks
Power forwards (basketball)
Small forwards
Sportspeople from Camden County, New Jersey